Juan Verdaguer (1915–2001) was a Uruguayan actor. He is best known for his role in the 1958 Argentine film Rosaura at 10 O'clock.

Selected filmography
 Estrellas de Buenos Aires (1956)
 Rosaura at 10 O'clock (1958)
 La Herencia (1964)
 Cleopatra Was Candida (1964)

References

Bibliography 
 Goble, Alan. The Complete Index to Literary Sources in Film. Walter de Gruyter, 1999.

External links 
 

1915 births
2001 deaths
Uruguayan male film actors
Uruguayan emigrants to Argentina
People from Montevideo